Paul Crossley (14 July 1948 – 11 March 1996) was an English professional footballer. He usually played as a winger.

Career
Crossley spent most of his career playing in the lower divisions of The Football League in England, but also enjoyed spells in the US with Seattle Sounders. He finished his career with the Baltimore Blast of the Major Indoor Soccer League.

Crossley served as an assistant coach with Loyola University. In 1991, he became the head coach of Shoreline Community College in Seattle. He also coached at several local high schools including Bothell, Shorecrest, Lynnwood, and Redmond. At the time of his death by heart attack, he had compiled a 46-30-17 record at Shoreline.

References

External links

NASL/MISL stats
Pro Soccer Player Paul Crossley Went From Sounders To Coaching

1948 births
1996 deaths
Baltimore Blast (1980–1992) players
Chester City F.C. players
English footballers
English expatriate footballers
Footballers from Rochdale
English Football League players
Association football wingers
Major Indoor Soccer League (1978–1992) players
North American Soccer League (1968–1984) players
Preston North End F.C. players
Rochdale A.F.C. players
Seattle Sounders (1974–1983) players
Southport F.C. players
Tranmere Rovers F.C. players
English expatriate sportspeople in the United States
Expatriate soccer players in the United States